Auction Squad was an Australian lifestyle television series aired on the Seven Network from 13 February 2002 until 2005. The show focused on renovating and improving houses that were going to be sold at auction, increasing their market value and pleasing their owners.

The renovations and improvements were carried out by the "Auction Squad" consisting of the presenter, landscapers, builders, carpenters, designers and laborers, with the renovations needing to be done in a twelve-hour day and under $10,000 dollars.

Host
Auction Squad was hosted by Johanna Griggs.

Seven Network original programming
2000s Australian reality television series
2002 Australian television series debuts
2004 Australian television series endings
Television series by Beyond Television Productions